Central Dupon Images is a professional photography company located in Paris, France.  The company is the result of a 2012 merger between Central Color and Dupon Images.

History
Central Color was founded in 1952 by the French photographer Lucien Lorelle, who handed over the company to his daughter Françoise Gallois, president of the Central Color Group and wife to former Brigadier General, novelist and politician, Pierre Gallois.

Central Color operated in Greenburgh, New York from 1983 to 2001. Central Color (U.S.) was owned and operated by François Gallois grandson of Lucien Lorelle and son of Françoise Gallois.

References

External links

Photographic studios
Photography companies of France
Companies based in Paris
French companies established in 1952